Richard Lowe Yomby William (born June 18, 1981 in Bafoussam) is a retired Cameroonian footballer who spent the majority of his career with the Richmond Kickers. He is currently an assistant coach at Old Dominion University for their men's soccer program.

Career

Youth and College
William attended high school at Lycee Classique Bafoussam in Cameroon, played club soccer for FootStar, and attended the University of Oschang, before moving to the United States in 2005 to attend and play college soccer at Old Dominion University. In his career at Old Dominion, William scored one goal and one assist, with 10 total shots.

During his college years, William also played in the USL Premier Development League with the Hampton Roads Piranhas.

Professional
William was drafted with the 23rd overall pick in the 2008 MLS SuperDraft by Kansas City Wizards and signed a developmental contract  before transferring to Puerto Rico Islanders of the USL First Division later that year.

In 2009 Yomby signed for the Richmond Kickers of the USL Second Division. He was named to the USL Second Division All-League First Team and won the defender of the year title. His Kickers team won the 2009 USL Second Division championship.

Yomby remained with Richmond for the 2010 and 2011 seasons and was defender of the year finalist and first team all league both seasons. The club signed him to a contract for the 2012 season on September 1, 2011.

Honors

Richmond Kickers
 USL all team 2009/ Defender of the year 
 USL all team 2010/ Defender of the year finalist 
 USL all team 2011/ Defender of the year finalist 
 USL all team 2012/ Defender of the year finalist 
 USL all team 2013/ Defender of the year finalist 
 USL all team 2014/ Defender of the year finalist. 
USL Second Division Champions (1): 2009

References

External links
Richmond Kickers bio
MLS player profile
Old Dominion bio

1981 births
Living people
Cameroonian footballers
Old Dominion Monarchs men's soccer players
Richmond Kickers players
Puerto Rico Islanders players
Sporting Kansas City players
Virginia Beach Piranhas players
USL League Two players
USL First Division players
USL Second Division players
USL Championship players
Expatriate footballers in Puerto Rico
Expatriate soccer players in the United States
Sporting Kansas City draft picks
Association football defenders
Old Dominion Monarchs men's soccer coaches
Cameroonian expatriate sportspeople in the United States